Lough Aleck More is a freshwater lake in the northwest of Ireland. It is located in County Donegal in the Rosses fishery.

Geography and natural history
The lake is a trout fishing destination with resident brown trout and seasonal sea trout.

See also
List of loughs in Ireland

References

Aleck More
Aleck More